Clay Township is one of the twenty-five townships of Muskingum County, Ohio, United States.  The 2000 census found 1,038 people in the township, 273 of whom lived in the unincorporated portions of the township.

Geography
Located in the southwestern corner of the county, it borders the following townships:
Newton Township - north
Brush Creek Township - east
York Township, Morgan County - south
Harrison Township, Perry County - west

Part of the village of Roseville is located in northwestern Clay Township.

Name and history
It is one of nine Clay Townships statewide.

Government
The township is governed by a three-member board of trustees, who are elected in November of odd-numbered years to a four-year term beginning on the following January 1. Two are elected in the year after the presidential election and one is elected in the year before it. There is also an elected township fiscal officer, who serves a four-year term beginning on April 1 of the year after the election, which is held in November of the year before the presidential election. Vacancies in the fiscal officership or on the board of trustees are filled by the remaining trustees.

References

External links
County website

Townships in Muskingum County, Ohio
Townships in Ohio